The Lynchburg Historic District encompasses the historic civic and commercial center of Lynchburg, Tennessee.  It extends along Main Street and Majors Boulevard from their eastern junction to Elm Street, and includes the main courthouse square.  The area developed as the economic and civic heart of Moore County after Lynchburg was designated the county seat in 1871, and much of its architecture dates to the period after 1883, when a fire destroyed many buildings.  The district was listed on the National Register of Historic Places in 1996.

See also
National Register of Historic Places listings in Moore County, Tennessee

References

National Register of Historic Places in Moore County, Tennessee
Greek Revival architecture in Tennessee
Italianate architecture in Tennessee
Historic districts on the National Register of Historic Places in Tennessee
Lynchburg, Tennessee
Historic districts in Tennessee